Peter van der Noort (born 30 August 1974) is a Dutch rower. He competed in the men's eight event at the 2000 Summer Olympics.

References

External links
 

1974 births
Living people
Dutch male rowers
Olympic rowers of the Netherlands
Rowers at the 2000 Summer Olympics
Sportspeople from Amersfoort